The First National Bank of Ekalaka and Rickard Hardware Store Building, in Ekalaka, Montana, was built in 1940.  In 2015 it became the first-listed historic site in Carter County to be listed on the National Register of Historic Places.  Carter was the last of Montana's 56 counties to get one.

It was designed and built by contractor V.E. Figg. (1893–1984).

It is the only Streamline Moderne building in Ekalaka.  It now serves as the town's town hall and public library.

References

Commercial buildings on the National Register of Historic Places in Montana
Commercial buildings completed in 1940
National Register of Historic Places in Carter County, Montana
City and town halls on the National Register of Historic Places in Montana
Libraries on the National Register of Historic Places in Montana
Streamline Moderne architecture in Montana
Bank buildings on the National Register of Historic Places in Montana
1940 establishments in Montana
Hardware stores of the United States